Alan Wesley Abbott (15 November 1926 – 28 November 2008) was an English first-class cricketer. He was born in Sutton-in-the-Elms, Leicestershire. He came to limited attention with some useful performances for the County XI during the makeshift fixture list of 1945, scoring 83 against the RAF Regiment. He played one first-class match for Leicestershire in 1946, failing to distinguish himself with either bat or ball in an eight wicket defeat against Kent at the Nevill Ground, Tunbridge Wells.

References 
 Wisden 1946

1926 births
2008 deaths
Place of death missing
Leicestershire cricketers
English cricketers